Colégio Notre Dame is a Catholic secondary school founded in Campinas, Brazil by the Congregation of Holy Cross in 1961.

References

Notre Dame (Campinas), Colegio
Congregations of Holy Cross
Catholic secondary schools in Brazil
Educational institutions established in 1961
1961 establishments in Brazil